USS Reposo II (SP-198) was a United States Navy patrol vessel in commission from 1917 to 1918.

Reposo II was built as the civilian steam yacht Sophia in 1882. She later was renamed Empress. In 1902 she was rebuilt and enlarged by the Greenpoint Construction Company at Greenpoint on Long Island, New York, and renamed Onondaga. She later was renamed Turbese and then Reposo II.

The U.S. Navy acquired Reposo II on 7 April 1917 for World War I service as a patrol vessel. She was commissioned as USS Reposo II (SP-198) sometime around 21 May 1917.

Reposo II patrolled the coastline between Key West, Florida, and Brunswick, Georgia, until May 1918.

From May to December 1918, Reposo II remained at anchor at the Charleston Navy Yard in Charleston, South Carolina. She was decommissioned there on 24 December 1918 and was sold on 8 August 1919 to John Pelly of Brooklyn, New York.

References

Department of the Navy: Navy History and Heritage Command: Online Library of Selected Images: U.S. Navy Ships: USS Reposo II (SP-198), 1917-1919. Previously the steam yacht Sophia, Empress, Onondaga, Turbese and Reposo II
NavSource Online: Section Patrol Craft Photo Archive: Reposo II (SP 198)

Patrol vessels of the United States Navy
World War I patrol vessels of the United States
Ships built in Brooklyn
1882 ships
Individual yachts